Makubuya is a surname. Notable people with the surname include:

James Makubuya, Ugandan ethnomusicologist, musician, dancer, and choreographer
Keith Makubuya (born 1993), Canadian soccer player
Kiddu Makubuya (born 1949), Ugandan lawyer, politician and academic
Apollo Makubuya, corporate lawyer, serves as the chairperson of the board of at Equity Bank Uganda.

Surnames of African origin